Corkscrew is a steel roller coaster built by Arrow Development at Cedar Point in Sandusky, Ohio, United States. Built in 1976, it was the first roller coaster in the world with 3 inversions. The coaster, which features Arrow's first vertical loop, was built during the same time period as The New Revolution at Magic Mountain. However, Revolution opened seven days prior and is therefore credited as the first modern-day coaster to feature a vertical loop.

Characteristics

Location

The ride's station is located on the midway next to Super Himalaya and near Power Tower. It was the first coaster to have inversions featuring a walkway underneath.

Trains
Corkscrew originally had three 24 passenger trains painted red, white & blue, a color scheme inspired by the U.S. Bicentennial in 1976, the year the ride was introduced. The ride currently operates with two trains to reduce the excessive stacking on the brake run. Riders are restrained by over-the-shoulder restraints with interlocking seat belts and are required to be  to ride. As the restraints cannot be unlocked by all cars at once, pedals are hinged on the backs of the cars to be manually released and locked individually by ride operators on the platform.

Ride experience

Layout
The train exits the station when the ride operator releases the pneumatic station brakes. The train then descends  at a 45-degree angle at a top speed of 48 mph (77 km/h). The train enters a bunny hop, drops lower than the main drop, and enters a vertical loop. Lastly, the train enters a slight ascending right turn followed by a shallow left turn and then enters the brake run with trim and block brakes before returning into the station.

Track
Almost daily, a train is transferred off the track once ridership reaches a point that permits two-train operation with little or no waiting in line. A different train is cycled off each day. The ride was designed by Ron Toomer and built by Arrow Dynamics.

Records
1. First roller coaster to invert 3 times

2. First roller coaster to go over a midway

References

External links

 Cedarpoint.com - Official Corkscrew Page
 POV of Corkscrew
 Corkscrew at The Point Online

Roller coasters introduced in 1976
Cedar Point
Roller coasters operated by Cedar Fair
Roller coasters in Ohio
Articles containing video clips